As Comadres is a theatrical comedy in two acts, written by Miguel M. Abrahão in 1978 and published first in 1981 in Brazil.

Plot summary
Beth Beast, feminist leader, reversing the prevailing values and seeking to take over and lead women around the country to assume a dominant position and autocratic before men, resolves to promote a congress in his home in order to educate the girls  of the true status of  women in society. The problem occurs when Amelia, submissive neighbor, decides to participate in discussions and carries with her husband Almeida, a typical macho incorrigible.

Bibliography
 COUTINHO, Afrânio; SOUSA, J. Galante de. Enciclopédia de literatura brasileira. São Paulo: Global; Rio de Janeiro: Fundação Biblioteca Nacional, Academia Brasileira de Letras, 2001: 2v.
 Sociedade Brasileira de Autores Teatrais
 National Library of Brazil - Archives
 Newspaper Archive of the Institute of History and Geography of Piracicaba
 The Journal Tribune of Piracicaba - Issue of August 25, 1981

External links
 - Brazilian Society of playwrights
Encyclopedia of Theatre

Notes

1978 plays
Brazilian plays